|}

The Her Majesty's Plate is a Listed flat horse race in Ireland open to thoroughbreds aged four years or older. It is run at the Down Royal over a distance of 1 mile and 6 furlongs (2,816 metres), and it is scheduled to take place each year in July.

The race was run over 12 furlongs until 2003 (except in 2002 when it was run over 10 furlongs) after which the distance was increased to 13 furlongs. Prior to 2018 it was open to horses aged three years or older.

The race was awarded Listed status in 2016 and increased in distance to 14 furlongs. In 2018 it was closed to three-year-olds as part of changes to enhance the European programme of stayers' races.

Records
Most successful horse (2 wins):
 Master of Reality - (2020, 2021)

Leading jockey (4 wins):
Declan McDonogh – Coat of Honour (2004), Masafi (2005), Dabadiyan (2013), Master of Reality (2021)

Leading trainer (4 wins):
John Oxx  – Beldarian (1998), Mkuzi (2002), Zanderi (2006), Mourad (2008)
Aidan O'Brien - Trojan War (2009), Chicago (2012), Order Of St George (2015), Perotan (2022)

Winners

See also 
 Horse racing in Ireland
 List of Irish flat horse races

Notes

References 

 Racing Post:

Flat races in Ireland
Down Royal Racecourse
Open long distance horse races
Horse races in Northern Ireland